The 2023 World Karate Championships will be held from 24 to 29 October 2023 in Budapest, Hungary.

Medalists

Men

Women

References

External links
World Karate Federation

World Karate Championships
World Championships
International sports competitions hosted by Hungary
Sports competitions in Budapest
World Karate Championships
World Karate Championships
Karate